Simon Jackson may refer to:

Simon Jackson (cricketer) (born 1985), Jamaican cricketer
Simon Jackson (judoka) (born 1972), Paralympic judoka of Great Britain
Simon Jackson (playwright), British playwright, filmmaker and poet
Simon Jackson, founder of Spirit Bear Youth Coalition, see Spirit Bear: The Simon Jackson Story